On 20 March 1969, a United Arab Airlines Ilyushin Il-18 crashed while attempting to land at Aswan Airport. 100 of the 105 passengers and crew on board were killed in the crash.

The crash
The flight was a non-scheduled international passenger service from Jeddah, Saudi Arabia to Aswan, Egypt. The aircraft was carrying home Muslim worshippers who had won a pilgrimage through a lottery. It was dark in the early morning when the flight attempted to land and blowing sand had reduced visibility to 2–3 kilometers. After two unsuccessful attempts to land, the aircraft was making a third try when it banked to the right and hit the left side of the runway. The starboard wing tore off and a fuel spillage followed which caused the crashed aircraft to burst into flames.

Cause
The probable cause was determined to be that the "Pilot descended below the minimum safe altitude without having the runway lights clearly in sight. A contributory factor was fatigue arising from continuous working hours without suitable rest periods."

References

External links



1969 in Egypt
Aviation accidents and incidents in 1969
Airliner accidents and incidents caused by pilot error
Airliner accidents and incidents caused by weather
Aviation accidents and incidents in Egypt
Accidents and incidents involving the Ilyushin Il-18
EgyptAir accidents and incidents
March 1969 events in Africa